Sources of Inspiration is an album by pianist Donald Brown which was recorded in 1989 and released on Muse Records.

Reception

In his review for AllMusic, Scott Yanow wrote "The strong quintet (which also features Eddie Henderson and altoist Gary Bartz) really digs into the diverse originals which are often reminiscent of a Blue Note date circa 1967".

Track listing
All compositions by Donald Brown except where noted
 "Capetown Ambush" – 6:52
 "Overtaken by a Moment" – 6:25
 "Do We Have to Say Goodbye" – 6:26
 "Embraceable You" (George Gershwin, Ira Gershwin) – 6:45 Additional track on CD release
 "New York" – 6:31
 "Phineas" – 7:06
 "The Insane Asylum" – 4:11 Additional track on CD release
 "The Human Impersonator" – 8:08

Personnel
Donald Brown – piano 
Eddie Henderson - trumpet, flugelhorn
Gary Bartz - soprano saxophone, alto saxophone 
Buster Williams – bass 
Carl Allen – drums

References

1990 albums
Donald Brown (musician) albums
Albums recorded at Van Gelder Studio
Muse Records albums